Tiantong Temple is a Buddhist temple located in Taibai Mountain of Yinzhou District, Ningbo, Zhejiang, in the People's Republic of China. Tiantong Temple is listed as one of the "Five Chan Buddhism Temples".

History

Jin dynasty
Tiantong Temple was first established by monk Yixing in 300, in the first year of the age of Yongkang of Emperor Hui of Jin.

Tang dynasty
In 732, in the twentieth year of the age of Kaiyuan of Emperor Xuanzong, monk Fa Xuan rebuilt it in the mountain valley, and named it "Taibai Jingshe".

In 757, in the second year of the age of Zhide of Emperor Suzong, monk Zong Bi and Xian Cong removed the temple to the foot of Taibai Peak. Two years later, the Emperor gave the name "Tiantong Linglong Temple".

In 841, in the first year of the age of Huichang of Emperor Wenzong, monk Jing extended the Temple.

In 869, in the tenth year of the age of Xiantong of Emperor Yizong, the Emperor gave the name "Tianshou Temple".

Song dynasty
In 1007, in the fourth year of the age of Jingde of Emperor Zhenzong, the Emperor named it "Tiantong Jingde Chan Temple".

In 1085, in the eighth year of the age of Yuanfeng of Emperor Shenzong, the Emperor bestowed a golden kasaya on its abbot Wei Bai.

In 1101, in the first year of the age of Jianzhong Jingguo of Emperor Huizong, the Emperor bestowed a title of "Master Fo Guo" on abbot Wei Bai.

In 1129, in the third year of the age of Jianyan of Emperor Gaozong, monk Zheng Jue became its abbot, he settled there, where he taught Chan Buddhism for 30 years, the temple had more than 1,000 monks. In 1134, in the fourth year of the age of Shaoxing of Emperor Gaozong, a monk's hall which can accommodate thousands of people was built.

In 1193, in the fourth year of the age of Shaoxi of Emperor Guangzong, the Gallery of A Thousand Buddhas was built by monk Xu An.

In the period of the Emperor Ningzong (1208 - 1224), Tiantong Temple was ranked third among the "Five Mountains and Ten Temples".

Yuan dynasty
In 1301, in the third year of the age of Dade of Temür Khan, the Gallery of A Thousand Buddhas was renamed "Chaoyuan Baoge" by the Emperor.

In 1359, in the nineteenth year of the age of Zhizheng of Toghon Temür, abbot Yuan Liang restored the "Chaoyuan Baoge". One year later, the Emperor bestowed a title of "Shanjue Puguang Xiangshi" on him.

Ming dynasty

In 1382, in the fifteenth year of Hongwu reign, the Emperor renamed it "Tiantong Chan Temple".

In 1587, in the fifteenth year of Wanli reign, a fire destroyed most of its buildings. That winter abbot Yin Huai rededicated a small temple on the ruins.

During the reign of Chongzhen Emperor (1631 - 1640), the temple was completely reconstruction by abbot Mi Yun.

Qing dynasty
In 1659, in the sixteenth year of the Shunzhi reigni, the Emperor gave thousand gold pieces for reconstruction of the Buddha Hall, and bestowed a title of "Master Hongjue" on abbot Dao Jin.

In 1902, in the twenty-eighth year of Guangxu reign, abbot Jichan implemented the Reform System of Open Selection of Abbot.

Republic of China

Master Yuan Ying was abbot of Tiantong Temple between 1930 and 1936. During his tenure, he taught Chan Buddhism there, attracted large numbers of practitioners. During the Second Sino-Japanese war, the abbot helped to organise a monastic rescue team to provide aid, providing shelter for homeless refugees and even went to Southeast Asia to raise fund.

People's Republic of China
During the Cultural Revolution, Tiantong Temple was closed for military usage and around seven hundred monastic residents were forced out of the temple, many of cultural relics was destroyed or stolen. The red guards also destroyed most of the Buddhist statues in the temple and responsible for the death of the temple's abbot.

In November 1978, the local government started to repair the badly damaged buildings.

In 1983, Tiantong Temple was designated as a "Han Area of National Key Buddhist Temples".

In 2006, it was listed as a China's national key cultural relic preservation unit by the State Council of China.

Architecture
The extant structure is based on the Ming and Qing dynasties building principles and retains the traditional architectural style. There are 700 halls and rooms in total. Now the existing main buildings include Shanmen, Heavenly Kings Hall, Mahavira Hall, Bell tower, Drum tower, Hall of Guru, Dharma Hall, Dining Room, and Buddhist Texts Library.

Heavenly Kings Hall
The Heavenly Kings Hall has double-eave gable and hip roofs covered with grey tiles. Maitreya is enshrined in the Hall of Four Heavenly Kings and at the back of his statue is a statue of Skanda. Statues of Four Heavenly Kings are enshrined in the left and right side of the hall.

Mahavira Hall
The Mahavira Hall enshrining the Three-Life Buddha, namely Sakyamuni, Amitabha and Bhaisajyaguru. The two disciple's statues are placed in front of the statue of Sakyamuni, the older is called Kassapa Buddha and the middle-aged is called Ananda. At the back of Sakyamuni's statue is the statue of Guanyin. The statues of Eighteen Arhats sitting on the seats before both sides of the gable walls.

References

Bibliography

External links

Buddhist temples in Ningbo
Major National Historical and Cultural Sites in Zhejiang
Tourist attractions in Ningbo
3rd-century establishments in China
3rd-century Buddhist temples
300s establishments
Yinzhou District, Ningbo